Sick may refer to:

Medical conditions
 Having a disease or infection
 Vomiting or having the urge to vomit (in British English)

Film and television
 Sick: The Life and Death of Bob Flanagan, Supermasochist, a 1997 documentary film
 Sick: Survive the Night, a 2012 Canadian horror film
 Sick (2022 film), an American horror film
 "Sick" (Law & Order: Special Victims Unit), a 2004 TV episode
 "Sick" (The Walking Dead), a 2012 TV episode
 "Sick" (The Young Ones), a 1984 TV episode

Music
 The Sick, a Swedish band formed by two members of Dozer

Albums
 Sick (Loaded album) or the title song, 2009
 Sick (Massacra album), 1994
 Sick (Sow album), 1998
 Sick!, by Earl Sweatshirt, or the title song, 2022
 Sick (EP), by Beartooth, 2013
 Sicks (album), by Barnes & Barnes, 1986
 The Sicks, an EP by Majandra Delfino, 2001

Songs
 "Sick" (song), by Adellitas Way, 2011
 "Sick", by CeCe Peniston, 2014
 "Sick", by Cxloe, 2019
 "Sick", by Dope from Felons and Revolutionaries, 1999
 "Sick", by Evanescence from Evanescence, 2011
 "Sick", by the Original 7ven from Condensate, 2011
 "Sick", by Rich the Kid from Boss Man, 2020
 "Sick", by Sea Girls, 2021
 "Sick", by Twelve Foot Ninja from Outlier, 2016

People with the surname
 Anna Sick (1803–1895), German composer and pianist
 Emil Sick (1894–1964), American brewer and sports entrepreneur
 Erwin Sick (1909–1988), German inventor and entrepreneur
 Gary Sick (born 1935), American academic and writer
 Gernot Sick (born 1978), Austrian football player
 Helmut Sick (1910–1991), Brazilian ornithologist
 Ingeborg Maria Sick (1858–1951), Danish writer and philanthropist
 Ingo Sick (1939–2021), Swiss experimental nuclear physicist
 Max Sick (1882–1961), German strongman and gymnast

Other uses
 Sick (magazine), an American humor magazine
 Sick AG, a German sensor technology corporation
 Sick's Stadium, a former baseball stadium in Seattle, Washington, US

See also
 Sick, Sick, Sick (disambiguation)
 Sickness (disambiguation)
 Sicko (disambiguation)
 SIC (disambiguation)
 Sikh, a name or title in Sikhism
 Six (disambiguation)
 The Six (disambiguation)
 

ja:シック